The 2008 Columbus Destroyers season was the 10th season for the franchise, their fifth season in Columbus. The Destroyers finished the season tied for the worst record in the league.

Standings

Regular season schedule

Coaching

Roster

Stats

Regular season

Week 1: at Colorado Crush

Week 2: at Dallas Desperados

Week 3: vs. Cleveland Gladiators

Week 4: at Utah Blaze

Week 5: vs. Orlando Predators

Week 6: vs. Tampa Bay Storm

Week 7: at New York Dragons

Week 8: vs. Philadelphia Soul

Week 9
Bye Week

Week 10: vs. Dallas Desperados

Week 11: at Kansas City Brigade

Week 12: at Philadelphia Soul

Week 13: vs. New York Dragons

Week 14: at New Orleans VooDoo

Week 15: vs. Georgia Force

Week 16: vs. Grand Rapids Rampage

Week 17: at Cleveland Gladiators

Columbus Destroyers
Columbus Destroyers seasons
2008 in sports in Ohio